How Many Elephants is an anti-poaching conservation charity based in the United Kingdom. The charity supports female and mixed ranger teams in Africa.

History
How Many Elephants charity was founded by British adventurer and conservationist Holly Budge in 2019.

Accomplishments
The charity has brought awareness to the plight of elephants in Africa and has also raised support and standards of equality for the female rangers that are protecting the elephants.

Campaigns
Founder Holly Budge embarks on adventurous campaigns to raise awareness and support for How Many Elephants. She skydived Mount Everest in -40 degree temperatures (she was the world first to do so as a woman). She made a world record racing across Mongolia on horseback. Her newest exploration will be hiking the entire Great Wall of China.

Exhibitions
Budge also raises awareness around the world through art and design in How Many Elephants exhibitions.

Awareness day
Spending several weeks with both the Black Mambas and Akashinga inspired How Many Elephants to launch World Female Ranger Week." to celebrate female rangers globally that are protecting wildlife.

See also
Black Mamba Anti-Poaching Unit
Akashinga

References

External links
Official site

Animal charities based in the United Kingdom
Nature conservation organisations based in the United Kingdom
Organizations established in 2013
Poaching
Animal conservation organizations
Women's organisations based in the United Kingdom
Elephant conservation organizations